"Diddy" is a song by American hip hop recording artist P. Diddy, featuring vocals from American singer Pharrell Williams. was released on 2001 as the third single of his third studio album The Saga Continues..., with the record labels Bad Boy Records and Arista Records. The song was produced by The Neptunes. The hook line is inspired by "Jimmy" a track by the Rap group Boogie Down Productions

Charts

References

Sean Combs songs
Pharrell Williams songs
Song recordings produced by the Neptunes
Songs written by Sean Combs
Songs written by Pharrell Williams
Songs written by Chad Hugo
2001 singles
Bad Boy Records singles
2001 songs
Songs written by Loon (rapper)